Fat, Sick and Nearly Dead is a 2010 American documentary film which follows the 60-day journey of Australian Joe Cross across the United States as he follows a juice fast to regain his health under the care of Joel Fuhrman, Nutrition Research Foundation's Director of Research.

Summary 
The feature-length film follows Cross, who was depressed, weighed 310 lbs, suffered from a serious autoimmune disease, and was on steroids at the start of the film, as he embarks on a juice fast. Cross and Robert Mac, co-creators of the film, both serve on the Nutrition Research Foundation's Advisory Board. Following his fast and the adoption of a plant-based diet, Cross states in a press release that he lost 100 pounds and discontinued all medications.
During his road-trip Cross meets Phil Staples, a morbidly obese truck driver from Sheldon, Iowa, in a truck stop in Arizona and inspires him to try juice fasting.
A sequel to the first film, Fat, Sick and Nearly Dead 2, was released in 2014.

Awards
Fat, Sick, and Nearly Dead won the Turning Point Award and shared the Audience Choice Award – Documentary Film at the 2010 Sonoma International Film Festival.

Critical reception

The film has received mixed reviews with review aggregation website Rotten Tomatoes giving it a rating of 67% "fresh" and Metacritic having an average score of 45 out of 100, based on 5 reviews. The Hollywood Reporter called it an "infomercial passing itself off a documentary". The New York Times stated that the film is "no great shakes as a movie, but as an ad for Mr. Cross's wellness program its now-healthy heart is in the right place". Journalist Avery Yale Kamila reviewed the film in 2011, reporting Cross planned to continue avoiding junk food and "eating a diet centered around whole food." She reported Cross had created an online community called Reboot Your Life.

See also
 List of vegan media

References

External links
 
 Fat, Sick and Nearly Dead 2 – official website

2010 films
2010 documentary films
American documentary films
Criticism of fast food
Works about raw foodism
Documentary films about obesity
Vegetarianism in the United States
Alternative medicine
2010s English-language films
2010s American films
Documentary films about plant-food diets
Juice